John McCloskey (March 10, 1810 – October 10, 1885) was an American senior-ranking prelate of the Catholic Church. He was the first American-born Archbishop of New York from 1864 until his death in 1885, having previously served as Bishop of Albany (1847–1864). In 1875, McCloskey became the first American cardinal. He served as the first president of St. John's College, now Fordham University, beginning in 1841.

Early life and education
John McCloskey was born in Brooklyn, New York, to Patrick and Elizabeth (née Hassan) McCloskey, who had immigrated to the United States from County Londonderry, Ireland, shortly after their marriage in 1808. He was baptized by Rev. Benedict Joseph Fenwick, S.J., on May 6, 1810, at St. Peter's Church in Manhattan. At that time Brooklyn did not yet have a Catholic church, so the family would row across the East River to Manhattan to attend Mass. 

At age 5, he was enrolled at a boarding school for boys in Brooklyn run by retired English actress Charlotte Melmoth. Even in his advanced years, he attributed his distinct enunciation to his training there. He moved with his family to Manhattan in 1817, and then entered the Latin school run by Thomas Brady, father of attorney James T. Brady and Judge John R. Brady. Following his father's death in 1820, the family moved to a farm in Bedford, Westchester County.
He became the ward of Cornelius Heeney, a wealthy merchant and friend of the family.

The 11-year-old McCloskey, after a brief visit with Rev. John Dubois, entered Mount St. Mary's College in Emmitsburg, Maryland, in September 1821.
When McCloskey attended Mount St. Mary's John Hughes, future archbishop of New York, taught Latin. As a student at Mount St. Mary's, he was described as having "won the admiration and esteem of his teachers and the respect and love of his college-mates by the piety and modesty of his character, his gentleness, and sweet disposition, the enthusiasm with which he threw himself into his studies, and his prominent standing in class." In his graduating year, he delivered a speech on patriotism that doubled as a defense of Horace's phrase, "It is sweet and fitting to die for one's country". Following his graduation in 1826, he returned to his mother's farm in Bedford.

Priesthood
During the spring of 1827, McCloskey was attempting to drive a team of oxen drawing a heavy load of logs when the wagon overturned and he was buried under the logs for several hours. After being discovered and taken to the house, he was completely blind and unconscious for several days. During his convalescence, however, McCloskey decided upon a vocation to the priesthood and later returned to Mount St. Mary's in September 1827 for his seminary training. Although he regained his eyesight, he tired easily and was generally in poor health throughout the rest of his life. In addition to his studies, he became a professor of Latin in 1829. He received the tonsure, minor orders, and subdiaconate all from Bishop Francis Kenrick.

On January 12, 1834, McCloskey was ordained a priest for the Diocese of New York by Bishop John Dubois, at St. Patrick's Old Cathedral. He thus became the first native New Yorker to enter the diocesan priesthood. 
He then served as a parochial vicar at St. Patrick's Cathedral and a chaplain at Bellevue Hospital until February 1834, when he became professor of philosophy and vice-president at the newly established St. Joseph's Seminary in Nyack. However, the seminary was destroyed by a fire in August of that same year.

McCloskey expressed his desire to minister to the victims of the cholera epidemic in New York City, but Bishop Dubois, at the suggestion of Heeney, instead sent him to Rome to strengthen his health and to further his studies at the Pontifical Gregorian University and University of the Sapienza (1834–1837). While in Rome, he befriended the likes of Père Lacordaire and Cardinals Thomas Weld and Joseph Fesch. Abandoning his pursuit of the degree of Doctor of Divinity in Rome, and departing from there in February 1837, he visited Germany, Belgium, France and England before returning to New York that summer. From August 1837 to March 1844, McCloskey served as pastor of St. Joseph's Church in Greenwich Village. His tenure at the parish was initially a rather contentious one, with the trustees refusing to pay him a salary or furnish his house; one of his younger parishioners was Eugene Casserly, later a U.S. Senator from California. He also showed concern for the needs of the homeless children living in Greenwich Village. In addition to his duties at St. Joseph's, McCloskey was the first President of St. John's College in Fordham from 1841 to 1842, where he also taught rhetoric and literature.

Episcopal ministry

Coadjutor Bishop of New York
In 1843, McCloskey returned full-time to St. Joseph's. Later that year he was appointed Coadjutor Bishop of New York and Titular Bishop of Axieri by Pope Gregory XVI. He received his episcopal consecration on March 10, 1844—his 34th birthday—from Bishop John Hughes, with Bishops Benedict Fenwick (who had baptized him as a child) and Richard Vincent Whelan serving as co-consecrators, at St. Patrick's Cathedral. Whereas Bishop Hughes was active and aggressive, his coadjutor was more meek and gentle. McCloskey busied himself primarily with a visitation of the entire diocese, and was also instrumental in the conversion of Isaac Hecker, founder of the Paulist Fathers, and of James Roosevelt Bayley, later Archbishop of Baltimore.

Bishop of Albany

McCloskey was named the first Bishop of the newly erected Diocese of Albany by Pope Pius IX on May 21, 1847. He was formally installed by Bishop Hughes on the following September 19. At the time of his arrival, the Upstate New York diocese covered , containing 60,000 Catholics, 25 churches, 34 priests, 2 orphanages, and 2 free schools. McCloskey’s flock was made up largely of poor, uneducated Irish immigrants fleeing the Great Famine.

McCloskey first selected St. Mary's Church as his episcopal see but it soon proved unsuitable, leading him to construct the Cathedral of the Immaculate Conception, whose cornerstone was laid in July 1848 and dedication took place in November 1852.

He attended the First Plenary Council of Baltimore in 1852, convened the first diocesan synod in October 1855, and was named an Assistant at the Pontifical Throne in 1862. During his tenure, he increased the number of parishes to 113 and the number of priests to 84, and established three academies for boys and one for girls, four orphanages, fifteen parochial schools, and St. Joseph's Provincial Seminary in Troy. He also introduced the Jesuits, Franciscans, Capuchins, Religious of the Sacred Heart, Sisters of Charity, Sisters of Mercy, Sisters of St. Joseph, and the De La Salle Christian Brothers into the diocese.

Archbishop of New York
Following the death of Archbishop Hughes in January 1864, McCloskey was widely expected to be named his successor. Distressed by the rumors, he wrote to Cardinal Karl von Reisach of the Congregation for the Propagation of the Faith, objecting, "I possess neither the learning, nor prudence, nor energy, nor firmness, nor bodily health or strength." Nevertheless, he was appointed the second Archbishop of New York on May 6, 1864. McCloskey, following the end of the Civil War in 1865, resumed the construction of the new cathedral begun under his predecessor; he later dedicated it in May 1879. In 1866 he attended the Second Plenary Council of Baltimore, where he preached the opening sermon with remarkable self-control and composure given the fact he had learned only moments before that St. Patrick's Old Cathedral had been gutted by a fire. However, the Trustees of the Cathedral immediately affirmed their intention to rebuild the Cathedral, and under the supervision of the Archbishop, the Cathedral was rebuilt sufficiently enough to celebrate Mass by Easter Sunday, April 21, 1867, just six months after the conflagration. The Cathedral rebuilding project was completed in full by March 13, 1868, and rededicated four days later on St. Patrick's Day by Archbishop McCloskey, and assisted by the pastor of the Cathedral, Father William Starrs. McCloskey participated in the First Vatican Council from 1869 to 1870, and voted in favor of papal infallibility despite his feelings that such a declaration was "untimely." On December 8, 1873, he solemnly dedicated the Archdiocese of New York to the Sacred Heart of Jesus.

McCloskey was created Cardinal-Priest of S. Maria sopra Minerva by Pius IX in the consistory of March 15, 1875, thus becoming the first American cardinal. The news of his elevation was well received by Catholics and non-Catholics alike, and was viewed as a sign of the growing prestige of the United States. He received the red biretta from Archbishop Bayley in a ceremony at the rebuilt St. Patrick's Cathedral on Mott Street on the following April 27. The Cardinal declared, "Not to my poor merits but to those of the young and already vigorous and most flourishing Catholic Church of America has this honor been given by the Supreme Pontiff. Nor am I unaware that, when the Holy Father determined to confer me this honor he had regard to the dignity of the See of New York, to the merits and devotion of the venerable clergy and numerous laity, and that he had in mind even the eminent rank of this great city and the glorious American nation." Following the death of Pius IX in February 1878, McCloskey left for Rome but arrived too late to participate in the papal conclave, which elected Pope Leo XIII. The new Pope bestowed the red hat upon him on March 28, 1878.

When Thomas Ewing Sherman, son of the famed Civil War general William Tecumseh Sherman, expressed his desire to become a Jesuit to his father, the elder Sherman wrote a letter to McCloskey in 1879 telling him to dissuade his son from such a course of action. However, the Cardinal encouraged the boy in his vocation after visiting with him. In response, the General condemned McCloskey in a St. Louis, Missouri newspaper in offensive terms and accused him of robbing him of a son. When pressed for comment by the newspaper's editor, McCloskey simply replied: "General Sherman's letter was marked 'personal and confidential.'" In 1880, he received Michael Corrigan, Bishop of Newark, as his coadjutor. His last major public appearance was in January 1884 for the Golden Jubilee celebration of his priestly ordination, for which Leo XIII sent him a jeweled chalice. In March 1884, with the help of President Chester A. Arthur and Secretary of State Frederick T. Frelinghuysen, the Cardinal helped save the Pontifical North American College from spoliation by the Italian government.

McCloskey's 21-year-long tenure as Archbishop of New York was a productive one. In response to the growing Catholic population in New York, he established 88 additional parishes (for a total of 229) in the Archdiocese, 25 of them in Manhattan, four in the Bronx, and one in Staten Island; the remaining were established outside the city. Among these were the first parish for black Catholics as well as new churches for the growing Polish and Italian communities. The number of priests also rose from 150 to 400 during his tenure. An advocate of Catholic education, at the time of his death there were 37,000 children enrolled at archdiocesan schools. He established several charitable societies for children and a hospital for the mentally ill.

Death
Throughout 1885, Cardinal McCloskey suffered from bouts of fever, intense pain, loss of sight, and a recurrence of malaria that aggravated what appeared to be signs of Parkinson's disease. Within a few months, he was hospitalized and later died at 75. Present were his private secretary, Msgr. John Farley as well as his three beloved nieces. His funeral Mass was held at St. Patrick's Cathedral on October 25, 1885; during the eulogy, Archbishop James Gibbons described him as "a kind father, a devoted friend, a watchful shepherd, a fearless leader and, above all, an impartial judge." John McCloskey is interred under the main altar at St. Patrick’s on Fifth Avenue.

Further reading
 
 The Catholic Historical Review, vol. 4, no. 3, 1918, pp. 370–73. JSTOR, (Review of Farley's book with observations re McCloskey)

References

External links

 

1810 births
1885 deaths
Pope Pius IX
19th-century American cardinals
American Roman Catholic clergy of Irish descent
Cardinals created by Pope Pius IX
Fordham University faculty
People from Brooklyn
Roman Catholic archbishops of New York
Burials at St. Patrick's Cathedral (Manhattan)
Roman Catholic bishops of Albany
Mount St. Mary's University alumni